Rama Navami is a Hindu festival that celebrates the birthday of Rama, the seventh avatar of the deity Vishnu. The festival celebrates the descent of Vishnu as the Rama avatar, through his birth to King Dasharatha and Queen Kausalya in Ayodhya, Kosala. This festival is a part of the Chaitra Navaratri in the spring, and falls on the ninth day of the bright half (Shukla Paksha) of Chaitra, the first month in the Hindu calendar. This typically occurs in the months of March or April by the Gregorian calendar. Rama Navami is an optional holiday for government employees in India.

The day is marked by Rama Katha recitals or reading of Rama stories, including the Hindu epic Ramayana which narrates the tale of Rama. Some Vaishnava Hindus visit a temple while others pray within their homes, and some participate in a bhajan or kirtan with music as a part of puja and aarti. Some devotees mark the event by taking miniature statues of the infant Rama, washing and clothing them, then placing them in cradles. Charitable events and community meals are also organized. The festival is an occasion for moral reflection for many Hindus. Some mark this day by vrata (fasting).

Important celebrations on this day take place at Ayodhya and numerous Rama temples all over India. Rathayatras, the chariot processions, of Rama, Sita, his brother Lakshmana and Hanuman, are taken out at several places. In Ayodhya, many take a dip in the sacred river Sarayu and then visit the Rama temple.

Celebrations 

The day is the ninth and last day of Chaitra (Vasanta) Navaratri (not to be confused with the better-known autumn Navratri). It celebrates the birth of Vishnu's 7th avatar, Rama. It is marked by the faithful with puja (devotional worship) such as bhajan and kirtan, by fasting and reading passages about Rama's life. Special cities in the Ramayana legends about Rama's life observe major celebrations. These include Ayodhya (Uttar Pradesh), Rameswaram (Tamil Nadu), Bhadrachalam (Telangana) and Sitamarhi (Bihar). Some locations organize Rath-yatras (chariot processions), while some celebrate it as the wedding anniversary festival (Kalyanotsavam) of Rama and Sita.

While the festival is named after Rama, the festival typically includes reverence for Sita, Lakshmana, and Hanuman, given their importance in Rama's life story. Some Vaishnavite Hindus observe the festival in Hindu temples, while others observe it within their homes. Surya, the Hindu sun god, is a part of the worship and ceremonies in some communities. Some Vaishnavite communities observe all nine days of Chaitra (Vasanta) Navaratri by remembering Rama and reading the Ramayana, with some temples organizing special discussion sessions in the evening. Charitable events to help those in need and community meals are organized by temples and Vaishnavite organizations, and for many Hindus, it is an occasion for moral reflection.

In Karnataka, Sri Ramanavami is celebrated by the local Mandalis (organizations) at some places, even on footpaths, by dispersing free panakam (a jaggery drink) and some food. Additionally, in Bengaluru, Karnataka, the Sree Ramaseva Mandali, R.C.T (R.) Chamrajpet, organizes India's most prestigious, month-long classical music festival. The uniqueness of this 80 year old musical extravaganza is that celebrated Indian classical musicians, irrespective of their religion, from both genres – Carnatic (South Indian) and Hindustani (North Indian) – descend down to offer their musical rendition to Rama and the assembled audience.

In eastern Indian states such as Odisha, Jharkhand, and West Bengal, the Jagannath temples and regional Vaishnava community observe Rama Navami, and treat it as the day when preparations begin for their annual Jagannath Ratha Yatra in summer.

Devotees associated with ISKCON fast through the daylight hours. A number of ISKCON temples introduced a more prominent celebration of the occasion of the holiday with the view of addressing needs of growing native Hindu congregation. It was however a notable calendar event on the traditional Gaurabda calendar with a specific additional requirement of fasting by devotees.

Significance 
The significance of the festival is that it indicates the victory of good over evil and establishment of dharma to beat adharma. The Rama Navami festival celebration starts with jalam (water) offering in the early morning to Surya (the sun god) to propitatiate him. This is due to the belief that the descendants of Surya were the ancestors of Rama.

Outside India
Rama Navami is one of the Hindu festivals that is celebrated by the Indian diaspora with roots in Uttar Pradesh and other states. The descendants of Indian indentured servants who were forced to leave India due to British-engineered famines and then promised jobs in colonial South Africa before 1910 in British-owned plantations and mines, and thereafter lived under the South African apartheid regime, continued to celebrate Rama Navami by reciting the Ramayana and by singing bhajans of Tyagaraja and Bhadrachala Ramdas. The tradition continues in contemporary times in the Hindu temples of Durban every year.

Similarly, in Trinidad and Tobago, Guyana, Suriname, Jamaica, other Caribbean countries, Mauritius, Malaysia, Singapore, and many other countries with Hindu descendants of colonial-era indentured workers forced to leave British India have continued to observe Rama Navami along with their other traditional festivals.

It is also celebrated by Hindus in Fiji and those Fiji Hindus who have re-migrated elsewhere.

See also
 Public holidays in India
 List of Hindu festivals
 Rama Navami riots

References and notes

External links
Rama Navami Special – Shri Raam Nam Mahima

Hindu festivals
Hindu holy days
Vaishnavism
Religious festivals in India
Hindu festivals in Nepal
Public holidays in Nepal
March observances
April observances
Swaminarayan Sampradaya
Rama
Vrata
Birthdays
Hindu festivals in India